The 2016–17 Albanian Women's National Championship was the 8th season of the Albanian Women's National Championship, the top Albanian women's league for association football clubs, since its establishment in 2009. The season started on 22 September 2016 and finished on 7 May 2017.

Vllaznia Shkodër secured their fourth league title after an unbeaten season – winning all 18 games whilst scoring 153 and only conceding one goal.

League table

Results

References

External links
Official website

Albanian Women's National Championship seasons
Alb
Women's National Championship